Ari Handel is an American neuroscientist, film producer and writer. He is known for co-writing the films Noah and The Fountain with his Harvard Dunster House suitemate Darren Aronofsky and for producing these films along with four other films; The Wrestler, Black Swan, Mother!, and The Whale. He started co-writing the film Noah around 2003.

Early life and career 
Handel grew up in a Jewish family in Newton, Massachusetts. He was born in Zürich, Switzerland, while his father was studying abroad, but he only lived there for about a year. Handel had an internship for Nova at WGBH, the Boston PBS station. He has a PhD in neurobiology from New York University. Torn between science writing and science education, he eventually became a film writer in an attempt to become a better communicator of science.

References

External links 

21st-century American writers
American film producers
American neuroscientists
American male screenwriters
Harvard University alumni
Jewish American scientists
Jewish American screenwriters
Living people
Mythopoeic writers
New York University alumni
Writers from Newton, Massachusetts
Scientists from Zürich
Screenwriters from Massachusetts
Jewish neuroscientists
1957 births
Film people from Zürich